Bursera bipinnata is a Mesoamerican species of trees widespread across Mexico and Central America from Chihuahua to Honduras.

Bursera bipinnata is one of two species commonly referred to as copal. Copal is the wood most commonly used by the woodcarvers in Oaxaca, Mexico.  The woodcarvers refer to Bursera glabrifolia as "macho" or male copal, which they like less than Bursera bipinnata, which they refer to as "Hembra" or female copal.

References

bipinnata
Flora of Central America
Flora of Mexico
Plants described in 1825
Taxa named by Adolf Engler
Taxa named by Alphonse Pyramus de Candolle
Taxa named by José Mariano Mociño
Taxa named by Martín Sessé y Lacasta
Woodcarving